400 Degreez is the third studio album by American rapper Juvenile. The album was released on November 3, 1998, on Universal Records and Baby's Cash Money Records. It remains Juvenile's best-selling album of his solo career. The album was certified 4× platinum by the RIAA on December 19, 2000.

Two official singles, "Ha" and "Back That Azz Up" (the latter having been released commercially as "Back That Thang Up") peaked at numbers 68 and 19 on the Billboard Hot 100, respectively. The album peaked at number two on Billboard's Top R&B/Hip Hop Albums music chart and number nine on the Billboard 200 music chart in 1999. It also claimed the top position on the Top R&B/Hip Hop Albums chart on the Billboard Year-End chart for 1999. As a single, "Back That Azz Up" was released, credited, and charted as the more censored "Back That Thang Up". The album also features a bonus remix of the single "Ha" with New York rapper Jay-Z, the only guest appearance outside of the Cash Money roster and the first time Cash Money collaborated with an East Coast rapper on a song. As of 2013, 400 Degreez has sold well over 6 million copies worldwide. The album won R&B Album of the Year at the 1999 Billboard Music Awards. The explicit version of the album was not totally uncensored such as the line "do a (homicide) with me" on "Gone Ride with Me" and "put a (pistol) in his face" in "Welcome 2 tha Nolia".

In September 2020, Rolling Stone ranked the album number 470 on their list of the 500 Greatest Albums of All Time.

Track listing
All songs are produced by Mannie Fresh

Notes and sample credits
"Ha" contains a sample of "Solja Rag" from Juvenile's previous album.

Personnel
 Ronald Williams  -  Executive producer
 Bryan Williams  -  Executive producer
 Juvenile  -  Performer
 Big Tymers  -  Performer
 Lil Wayne  -  Performer
 Mannie Fresh -  Producer, engineer, mixing
 Turk -  Performer
 B.G.  -  Performer
 Pen & Pixel - Cover art

Charts

Weekly charts

Year-end charts

Certifications

See also
Billboard Year-End

References

1998 albums
Juvenile (rapper) albums
Cash Money Records albums
Albums produced by Mannie Fresh
Hip hop albums by American artists